Sophie Pender (born 1997) is a British social mobility campaigner and activist. She founded the UK-based non-profit the 93% Club, which looks to support university students who had attended state school in finding employment.

Early life and education 
Pender grew up on a North London council estate. She lost her father to substance abuse. Pender attended Hertswood Academy in Borehamwood. She worked two jobs to support herself during her studies, and ended up getting all A*s for her A-Levels. She was the first student in her school to achieve straight A*s. Pender eventually studied English at the University of Bristol, and was the first in her family to attend higher education. Pender graduated from the University of Bristol in 2017.

Career 
During her time in the University of Bristol she became involved with efforts to improve social mobility, including joining the charity Access Aspiration. Pender was named a Woman to Watch in 2017.

Whilst an undergraduate student Pender founded the 93 Percent Club. The club became a national network of student societies, who work with organisations to improve the employability of state school graduates. Pender has referred to the 93% Club as an "alternative Bullingdon Club".

References 

1997 births
Living people
Alumni of the University of Bristol
British women activists
People from Borehamwood